Centre Fédéral de Basket-ball, shortly CFBB, is a French basketball club, based in Paris. The club's squads are filled with players from the training institute INSEP. The first team of the club currently plays in the Nationale Masculine 1, the third tier level in France. The organisation is managed by the Fédération Française de Basket-Ball (FFBB), the national French basketball association.

Notable players

 Boris Diaw
 Ousmane Dieng
 Sekou Doumbouya
 Damien Inglis
 Joffrey Lauvergne
 Jérôme Moïso
 Tony Parker
 Johan Petro
 Vincent Poirier
 Ronny Turiaf

References

External links
FFBB Official website

Basketball teams in France
Basketball teams in Paris